Chasing Time is a reality television and documentary show screened in the United Kingdom from 2001 to 2003.  It was akin to a game show in a race format where a team of two related people completed a series of challenges in a major world city in a limited period of time.  The show is also named Chasing Time In with some sources.

Premise
The premise was similar to The Amazing Race, except the one team completed all challenges in one world city completely unknown to them.  The time limit was typically 12 hours for all tasks, but each task also had its own time limit.

External links
 

2001 British television series debuts
2003 British television series endings
2000s British reality television series